Shoalhaven was an electoral district for the Legislative Assembly in the Australian state of New South Wales from 1859 to 1904. It included the lower part of the Shoalhaven valley. It replaced parts of Eastern Camden and St Vincent. It was replaced by Allowrie.

Members for Shoalhaven

Election results

References

Former electoral districts of New South Wales
Constituencies established in 1859
1859 establishments in Australia
Constituencies disestablished in 1904
1904 disestablishments in Australia